Madison Elle Beer (born March 5, 1999) is an American singer. Born in New York, she began posting covers to YouTube in early 2012. Beer gained substantial media coverage when Justin Bieber posted a link to one of her covers. She released her debut single, "Melodies", in 2013.

In 2018, Beer released her debut EP, As She Pleases. The project was supported by the singles "Dead" and "Home with You", both of which were certified Gold by the RIAA. The following year, Beer signed with Epic Records, later releasing her debut studio album, Life Support in 2021. The album was supported by several singles, including "Selfish", which gained traction on the media sharing app TikTok, leading to the single's RIAA Gold certification.

Aside from her solo work, Beer has voiced the virtual character Evelynn in the League of Legends virtual band K/DA. As a member of the group she has released the internationally charting singles "Pop/Stars" (2018) and "More" (2020). She has also appeared on television series such as Todrick (2015) and RuPaul's Drag Race (2020), and in the film Louder Than Words (2013).

Early life 
Madison Elle Beer was born in Jericho, New York, on March 5, 1999. Her father, Robert Beer, is a real estate developer, and her mother, Tracie, worked as an interior designer before putting that aside to help navigate Madison's career. Beer appeared on the cover of Child magazine after winning a modeling competition at four years old. She has a younger brother named Ryder, and her parents divorced when she was young. Her family is Jewish, and she celebrated her Bat Mitzvah in 2012.

Career

2012–2018: Career beginnings and As She Pleases 

Beer began posting videos on YouTube of her singing covers of popular songs in early 2012. They gained the attention of Justin Bieber, who tweeted a link to her cover of Etta James's "At Last" to his followers. This caused Beer to trend worldwide on Twitter and gain substantial media coverage. Bieber signed Beer personally to the record label to which he is signed, Island Records, and at the time she was managed by Bieber's manager Scooter Braun.

Beer partnered with Monster High, and recorded a theme song for the franchise titled "We Are Monster High". In February 2013, Cody Simpson re-released his song "Valentine" with Beer, which was played on Radio Disney, but was never officially released. On September 12, 2013, Beer released her debut single and music video called "Melodies" which was written by Peter Kelleher, Ben Kohn, Thomas Barnes and Ina Wroldsen. The video featured a guest appearance by Bieber.

Beer began work on her debut album which was slated to have pop and R&B influences, stating there "will be slow songs, sad songs, happy songs, songs about boys, and songs about being who you are. I'm making sure I'm happy with all of the songs, because if I am not happy with them, I can't expect anyone else to be, you know?" The album is believed to have been scrapped.

"Unbreakable" was the second single released by Beer. The song was released on June 17, 2014, and was written by Jessica Ashley, Evan Bogart, Heather Jeanette Miley, Matt Schwartz, Emanuel Kiriakou and Andrew Goldstein and was produced by the latter two. On February 16, 2015, it was announced that Beer was set to be a featured artist in a new single by DJs Mako titled "I Won't Let You Walk Away". The song was released for digital download on February 24, 2015, along with a music video. The song reached number 43 on the Hot Dance/Electronic Songs, number 33 on the Dance/Electronic Digital Songs, and number 19 on the Dance/Mix Show Airplay charts in the United States. On September 24, 2015, Beer released "All For Love" featuring American duo Jack & Jack.
Beer recorded her EP, titled As She Pleases, over a three-year period. It was released on February 2, 2018. The same month, she walked the runway for Dolce & Gabbana Fall 2017 show at Milan Fashion Week. "Dead" was released as the lead single from the EP on May 19, 2017. The music video was later released on August 3, 2017. Beer then released "Say It to My Face" as the second single from the EP on November 3, 2017. The music video was released on November 15, 2017.

On March 10, 2018, "Home with You" was released as the third and final single from the EP. In August 2018, the song peaked at number #21 on the Billboard Mainstream Top 40 chart, making her the only female solo artist on the charts without a major music label. She made her official festival debut at Lollapalooza on August 2, 2018, in Chicago. Beer was featured on "Blame It On Love", a song from French DJ David Guetta seventh studio album 7. The video game developer Riot Games released a song and music video for "Pop/Stars" on November 3, 2018. The song is performed by Beer, Miyeon, and Soyeon from (G)I-DLE and Jaira Burns under a virtual K-pop group named K/DA. This song was used as a theme song for the online game League of Legends towards the end of 2018. On November 9, 2018, Beer released "Hurts Like Hell" featuring American rapper Offset.

2019–present: Life Support and upcoming second studio album

Beer was featured on "All Day and Night" by DJs Jax Jones and Martin Solveig under their alias Europa. This song was released on March 28, 2019. On May 17, 2019, Beer released the single "Dear Society". The single was initially meant to be included on the track list of her debut album, but was ultimately removed from the final track listing. On August 9, 2019, Beer announced on her Instagram account that she had signed with Epic Records.

In January 2020, she released "Good in Goodbye" as the lead single from her debut studio album, Life Support. This was followed by its second single "Selfish"which reached number nineteen on the US Bubbling Under Hot 100 chart and impacted contemporary hit radio in the United States laterand the promotional single "Stained Glass"; Beer co-directed the music video of the latter. The former would later be certified Gold by the RIAA in the United States. She released the third single from the album, "Baby", on August 21, 2020. In September 2020, cosmetics retailer Morphe launched a collection with Beer called Morphe x Madison Beer. On October, she reprised her role in K/DA as Evelynn and was featured on two tracks for the EP All Out: "More" along with the original lineup and Lexie Liu, and also "Villain" which also features German singer Kim Petras. The fourth single from Life Support, "Boyshit", was released in December 2020. Alongside the song's release, she announced the release date for the album. Beer was announced as Vevo's new LIFT artist in December 2020. In support of the campaign, live performances for previous singles "Selfish" and "Boyshit" were released that same month. A short film for the campaign titled Dreams Look Different in the Distance was released in January 2021.

Life Support was released on February 26, 2021, which Beer co-wrote entirely and co-produced most of the record as well. The album received generally favorable critic reviews with Dani Blum of Pitchfork calling it "ambitious yet shallow, seemingly intent on proving its own seriousness". NME's Hannah Mylrea was more favorable and gave it 4/5 stars. Riff Magazine's Mike DeWald gave the album a 8/10, saying "It may have been years in the making, but Madison Beer's first album is worth the wait for pop fans." The album debuted at number sixty-five on the US Billboard 200, and also peaked in the top thirty on both the Canadian Albums and OCC UK Albums charts. That same month, Beer confirmed in a podcast interview with The Zach Sang Show that she had already started working on the follow-up to Life Support, saying "We have seven songs on the second album already, and we had four days of a writing camp." In May 2021, she announced a North American tour, titled The Life Support Tour, in support of her album, however, the following month she extended it to a European leg. Maggie Lindemann and musician Audriix served as the opening acts for the North American leg while Leah Kate served as the European leg opener. The tour began in late October that year in Toronto, Canada and ended in late November in Los Angeles with the European leg picking up towards the end of March 2022 in Madrid, Spain and concluding by late April in Oslo, Norway. Beer revealed to Manchester Evening News that her upcoming second studio album was "coming together really nicely" and she was working on songs for it. She released the song "Reckless" on June 3, 2021, intended as the lead single of her upcoming sophomore studio album. The song was met with critical acclaim for its lyrical content and vulnerability, and peaked in the top forty on the Billboard US Mainstream Top 40. Later that month, Beer co-founded Know Beauty, a DNA personalizationbased skincare brand, with Vanessa Hudgens. In August, she launched a 90sinspired clothing collection in collaboration with British e-commerce fashion retailer Bohoo. On November 4, 2021, Beer released her first soundtrack song, "Room For You", as part of the film Clifford the Big Red Dog's soundtrack album, which was released later that month.

In July 2022, Beer appeared in a cameo alongside various internet personalities in the music video for "Dolls", the title track and third single from singer and social media personality Bella Poarch's debut extended play of the same name. On July 22, 2022, Beer released the soundtrack song, "I Have Never Felt More Alive", for Lionsgate's Jeffrey Dean Morgan and Virginia Gardnerstarrer film Fall.

Beer released "Dangerous" as the lead single to her second studio album on August 26, 2022. It was followed by "Showed Me (How I Fell in Love with You)" on October 14, 2022.

Artistry and influences 
Beer has stated that her inspirations in her music and songwriting are Lana Del Rey, Daft Punk, Melanie Martinez, and Ariana Grande. When questioned if she was inspired by Grande, Beer responded "I mean, you know Ariana's been one of my favorite people ever for like, so much of my career and like, even just prior to my career, so I'm sure she's definitely influenced me, a lot. ... But, I hate this narrative that's being pushed about me and her, you know, that it's kinda like this competition thing, like this is someone I idolize and someone I look up to."

Personal life 
Beer was in a relationship with Jack Gilinsky of Jack & Jack from 2015 to 2017. She briefly dated Brooklyn Beckham after her breakup with Gilinsky. She was in an on-and-off relationship with Zack Bia from late 2017 to early 2019.

In 2016, Beer discussed her sexuality in a YouNow chat, stating, "I'm not a lesbian, but I definitely love girls," and that she has been in love with a woman in the past. She addressed her sexuality again in a March 2020 TikTok livestream, stating that she is bisexual: "'Are you bi?' Yeah, I came out like, four, three years ago I'd say. People always ask me that, and I'm like I've answered this question so many times. It's kinda weird. ... I am bi, always have been, it's nothing new."

Beer has struggled with mental health issues, and has stated that social media and the internet have contributed to them. She has engaged in self-harm, and has been diagnosed with borderline personality disorder. Beer currently resides in Los Angeles.

Discography 

Studio albums
Life Support (2021)

Tours 
Headlining
 As She Pleases Tour (2018)
 The Life Support Tour (2021–2022)

Filmography

As actress/personality

As performer

Awards and nominations

References

External links 

 
 

1999 births
Living people
21st-century American Jews
21st-century American LGBT people
21st-century American women singers
American child singers
American women pop singers
American women singer-songwriters
LGBT people from New York (state)
American LGBT singers
American LGBT songwriters
Bisexual songwriters
Bisexual Jews
Bisexual singers
Bisexual women
Island Records artists
Jewish American musicians
Jewish American actresses
Singer-songwriters from New York (state)
People from Jericho, New York
Schoolboy Records artists
People from Long Island
People with borderline personality disorder
K/DA members
American bisexual writers